Dongdaqiao is a station on Line 6 of the Beijing Subway. This station opened on December 30, 2012.

Station layout 
The station has an underground island platform.

Exits
There are 4 exits, lettered A, B, D1, and D2. Exit D1 is accessible.

References

External links

Railway stations in China opened in 2012
Beijing Subway stations in Chaoyang District